Big Mouth is a 2022 South Korean television series starring Lee Jong-suk, Im Yoon-ah, and Kim Joo-hun. It aired from July 29 to September 17, 2022 on MBC TV's Fridays and Saturdays at 21:50 (KST) time slot. It is also available for streaming on Disney+ in selected regions.

Synopsis
The series tells the story of an underperforming lawyer who gets caught up in a murder case. In order to survive and protect his family, he digs into a huge conspiracy among the privileged upper classes.

Cast

Main
 Lee Jong-suk as Park Chang-ho
 A third-rate lawyer with a ten percent success rate, called "Big Mouth" by his legal acquaintances due to his tendency to speak before acting. His life is suddenly in danger when he is mistaken for a genius conman known as "Big Mouse".
 Im Yoon-ah as Ko Mi-ho
 Chang-ho's supportive wife who is a nurse and has a bold personality, as well as outstanding beauty.
 Kim Joo-hun as Choi Do-ha
 The ambitious mayor of Gucheon, whose goal in life is to become the most dignified president.

Supporting

NR Forum
 Yang Kyung-won as Gong Ji-hoon
 The president of the media conglomerate Gukdong Daily and the chairman of the NR Forum.
 Kim Jung-hyun as Jung Chae-bong
 The director of Chilbong Academy.
 Lee Yoo-joon as Han Jae-ho
 A surgeon.
 Oh Ryung as Lee Du-geun
 Legal counsel of NR Forum.
 Yoon Seok-hyun as Cha Seung-tae
 Managing director of OC Group.
 Park Hoon as Seo Jae-yong
 Head of the Department of Internal Medicine, Hematology and Oncology at Gucheon University Hospital.
 Hong Ji-hee as Jang Hye-jin
 Jae-ho's wife who is a culinary researcher.
 Kim Kyu-seon as Ashley Kim
 Ji-hoon's wife, who is a Korean-American and the director of Woojung Gallery.
 Jang Hyuk-jin as Choi Jung-rak
 A prosecutor at Gucheon Public Prosecutors' Office.

Gucheon Hospital
 Ok Ja-yeon as Hyun Ju-hee
 Do-ha's wife who is the director of Gucheon Hospital.
 Kim Seon-hwa as Park Mi-young
 The head nurse at Gucheon Hospital.
 Park Se-hyeon as Jang Hee-joo
 A nurse at Gucheon Hospital.

Gucheon Prison
 Jeong Jae-sung as Park Yoon-gap
 The prison warden of Gucheon Prison.
 Kim Dong-won as Gan Su-cheol
 A prison officer at Gucheon Prison.
 Kwak Dong-yeon as Jerry / Oh Jin-chul (real name)
 A scammer with three previous convictions who respects the genius conman "Big Mouse".
 Yang Hyung-wook as Noh Park
 A prisoner at Gucheon Prison.

People around Chang-ho
 Lee Ki-young as Ko Gi-kwang
 Mi-ho's father.
 Oh Eui-shik as Kim Soon-tae
 A lawyer who is Chang-ho's best friend and assistant.

Extended
 Yoo Tae-ju as Tak Kwang-yeon
 A psychopath death row inmate at Gucheon Prison.
 Song Kyung-cheol as Yang Chun-sik
 A gang leader.
 Park Jeong-bok as  Go Tae-sik
 A prisoner at Gucheon Prison.
 Shin Seung-hwan as Peter Hong
 Jeon Gook-hwan as Kang Seong-geun (Chairman Kang)

Special appearances
 Yoo Su-bin as Chang-ho and Mi-ho's neighbor. 
 Kim Do-wan as Chang-ho and Mi-ho's neighbor.

Production and release

Big Mouth was initially confirmed to be released on tvN. However, in April 2022, it was announced that the series would air on MBC TV's newly established Fridays and Saturdays time slot instead, in July.

Original soundtrack

Part 1

Viewership

Awards and nominations

Notes

References

External links
  
 
 
 

Korean-language television shows
MBC TV television dramas
Television series by AStory
Television series by Studio Dragon
South Korean legal television series
South Korean crime television series
2022 South Korean television series debuts
2022 South Korean television series endings